Akkapporinte Irupathu Nasrani Varshangal is a Malayalam novel written by Benyamin.  The novel narrates years of long clash between two major Eastern Syrian Churches of Kerala. Through the course of the novel the reader gets the history of Christian Churches operating in Kerala and how they were separated from a common Syrian Parent Church. The writer bases its content on a family and place named Manthalir wrapping many historical incidents necessary to do so. The novel follows an engaging narrative. Even though the novel is a fictional work most of the incidents depicted in the novel has overt historical connections.

Malayalam novels